This is list of high rise buildings in Romania, itemizing buildings in Romania that are  or taller. This overlaps with topic of more complete List of tallest buildings in Bucharest, which lists 52 buildings  or taller in Bucharest alone. For other tall structures in Romania see list of tallest structures in Romania.

Completed buildings

Tallest under construction, approved and proposed

Under construction

Cancelled and on-hold

See also
List of tallest structures in Romania
List of tallest buildings in Bucharest
List of tallest buildings in the Balkans

References

External links

 
 
Romania